JCSAT-2A, known as JCSAT-8 before launch, is a geostationary communications satellite operated by SKY Perfect JSAT Group (JSAT) which was designed and manufactured by Boeing Satellite Systems on the BSS-601 platform. It has Ku-band and C-band payload and was used to replace JCSAT-2 at the 154° East longitude. It covers Japan, East Asia, Australia and Hawaii.

Satellite description 
The spacecraft was designed and manufactured by Boeing Satellite Systems on the BSS-601 satellite bus. It had a launch mass of  a power production of 3.7 kW and an 11-year design life. Stowed for launch it measured , with its solar panels and antennas deployed it measured .

Its payload is composed of sixteen 57 MHz Ku-band plus eleven 36 MHz and five 54 MHz C-band transponders, for a total bandwidth of 1,578 MHz. Its high-power amplifiers had an output power of 120 watts on Ku-band and 34 watts on C-band.

The Ku-band footprint covers only Japan, while the C-band beams cover Japan, East Asia, Australia and Hawaii.

History 
In April 2000, JSAT ordered JCSAT-8 from Boeing (which had acquired the HS-601 business from Hughes), to replace JCSAT-2 at the 154° East slot. It would provide coverage to Japan, East Asia, Australia and Hawaii.

An Ariane 44L successfully launched JCSAT-8 on 29 March 2002 at 01:29 UTC from Centre Spatial Guyanais. Once successfully deployed, it was renamed JCSAT-2A.

References 

Communications satellites in geostationary orbit
Satellites using the BSS-601 bus
Spacecraft launched in 2002
Communications satellites of Japan
Satellites of Japan